Hibbertia stichodonta is a species of flowering plant in the family Dilleniaceae and is endemic to coastal New South Wales. It is a small, spreading shrub with a few wiry, hairy branches, linear to oblong leaves and yellow flowers with 22 to 30 stamens arranged around three hairy carpels.

Description 
Flowering occurs from September to November.

Taxonomy 
Hibbertia stichodonta was first formally described in 2013 by Hellmut R. Toelken in the Journal of the Adelaide Botanic Gardens from specimens collected near Budgewoi in 1993. The specific epithet (stichodonta) "in-rows-toothed" referring to teeth on the lower sides of the leaves.

Distribution and habitat 
This hibbertia grows in forest on low hills on the North and Central Coasts of New South Wales.

See also 
 List of Hibbertia species

References 

stichodonta
Flora of New South Wales
Plants described in 2013
Taxa named by Hellmut R. Toelken